Celester "CC" Collier is an American basketball coach at Bowie High School in Austin, Texas. He was a basketball player at Paris Junior College from 1979–1981 and for Southwest Texas State University from 1981 to 1983 and coached at the school in a few years after that. He was inducted into the Paris Junior College Hall of Fame and the Southwest Texas State Hall of Honor  in 2001.

He coached Veronica Mars creator and Dawson's Creek and Drive Me Crazy writer Rob Thomas at San Marcos High School in the late 1980s. Thomas's team has the second best record under Collier (32–4).

He has been named District Coach of the Year multiple times and was Bowie High School's Coach of the Year in 1994.

In 2004, Bowie High School was selected as the filming location for the feature film The Quiet. The Bowie High School basketball team was chosen to act in the film and Collier was the head coach for Shawn Ashmore's  team in the movie.

In 2006, Collier was named Coach of the Year in Central Texas by the Austin American-Statesman, guiding his team to a 33–3 record.

In 2019, Collier led Bowie to its first regional tournament in 25 years.

Head coaching record

References

Year of birth missing (living people)
Living people
American men's basketball coaches
American men's basketball players
Basketball coaches from Texas
Basketball players from Texas
High school basketball coaches in Texas
Paris Dragons basketball players
Texas State Bobcats men's basketball coaches
Texas State Bobcats men's basketball players
20th-century births